Mar Shimun XIX Benyamin (1887– 3 March 1918) served as the 117th Catholicos-Patriarch of the Church of the East.

Life
He was born in 1887 in the village of Qochanis in the Hakkari Province, Ottoman Empire (modern-day southeastern Turkey). His paternal uncle and immediate predecessor was Mar Shimun XVIII Rubil, patriarch from 1860 to 1903). His father was Eshai, a brother of Shimun XVIII Rubil, and his mother was Asyat,  daughter of Kambar from Iyl. He had six siblings: Isaiah, Zaya, Paulos (who succeeded him as Patriarch), David, Hormizd, Surma. His brother Hormizd was later killed while studying in Istanbul during the Deportation of Armenian intellectuals on 24 April 1915.

He was consecrated a Metropolitan on March 1, 1903, by his uncle, the Catholicos Patriarch, who died on March 16, 1903. He was eighteen years old when he succeeded to the position and occupied the patriarchal See of Seleucia-Ctesiphon at Qudshanis for 15 years.

Death
In 3 March 1918, Mar Benyamin along with many of his 150 bodyguards were assassinated by Simko Shikak (Ismail Agha Shikak), a Kurdish agha, in the town of Kuhnashahir in Salmas (Persia) under a truce flag (see Assyrian genocide).

Quotes
"It is impossible for me and my people to surrender after seeing the atrocities done to my Assyrian people by your government; therefore my brother is one, my people are many, I would rather lose my brother but not my nation."

See also
List of Patriarchs of the Assyrian Church of the East
Our Smallest Ally
Assyrian volunteers

References

Sources

External links
 Official site of the Assyrian Church of the East
 The Invitation of the Patriarch Mar Binyamin at www.aina.org (First-hand account by Malik Daniel Bar Malik Ismail of Mar Benyamin's assassination)

1887 births
1918 deaths
Binyamin
Persecution of Christians in the Ottoman Empire
Christian saints killed by Muslims
Assyrians from the Ottoman Empire
Emigrants from the Ottoman Empire to Iran
Iranian Assyrian people
People murdered in Iran
People who died in the Assyrian genocide
20th-century Christian saints
Assyrian saints
Assyrian military leaders
People from Hakkari
Assassinated religious leaders
20th-century bishops of the Assyrian Church of the East